This article lists the confirmed squads for the 2021 Men's FIH Hockey Junior World Cup tournament held in Bhubaneswar, India between 24 November and 5 December 2021. The 16 national teams were required to register a playing squad of up to 18 players. Players born on or after 1 January 2000 were eligible to compete in the tournament.

A flag is included for coaches that are of a different nationality than their own national team. Those marked in bold have been capped at full international level.

Pool A

Belgium

Head coach: Jeroen Baart

The final squad was announced on 21 October 2021.

Chile

Head coach:  Alejandro Gomez

The final squad was announced on 16 November 2021.

Malaysia

Head coach: Wallace Tan

The final squad was announced on 5 November 2021.

South Africa

Head coach: Siphesihle 'Sihle' Ntuli

The final squad was announced on 26 October 2021.

Pool B

Canada

Head coach: Indy Sehmbi 

The final squad was announced on 29 October 2021.

France

Head coach: Aymeric Bergamo

The final squad was announced on 9 November 2021.

India

Head coach:  Graham Reid

The final squad was announced on 11 November 2021.

Poland

Head coach: Jacek Adrian

The final squad was announced on 17 November 2021.

Pool C

Netherlands
Head coach: Michiel van der Struijk

The final squad was announced on 16 November 2021.

South Korea
Head coach: Kim Jong-yi

Spain
Head coach:  Alejandro Siri

The final squad was announced on 5 November 2021.

United States
Head coach: Pat Harris

The final squad was announced on 15 October 2021.

Pool D

Argentina
Head coach: Lucas Rey

The final squad was announced on 29 October 2021.

Egypt
Head coach: Abu-Talib Magib

Germany
Head coach: Valentin Altenburg

The final squad was announced on 18 October 2021.

Pakistan
Head coach: Muhammad Danish Kaleem

References

Men's FIH Hockey Junior World Cup squads
Squads